is a Japanese idol. She is a former member of the Japanese idol group AKB48 and enka singer.  Her nickname is Wasamin. Her talent agency is Nagara Productions. She was also a member of the sub-unit Watarirouka Hashiritai 7.

Career 
2008
 December - Passed "AKB48's 4th Trainee Audition" and started her career as AKB48's 7th generation.
2009
 August 23 - During "Sokaku Matsuri" concert, it was announced that she was chosen to be a regular member. However, it took almost a year before the new teams started their theater shows, so she only officially became a member of Team A as of 27 July 2010. During the long wait, she was quite distressed about the situation and said, "I knew I had to do something, but I didn't know what to do."
 September 27 - Participated in AKB48's first oversea solo concert in New York. She was the only trainee alongside Sumire Sato.
 October 30 - Participated in AKB48's first musical troupe "∞・Infinity".
2010
 May 17 - Moved agency from AKS to Production Ogi.
 May 18 to 23 - Starred alongside Haruka Kohara (ex-SDN48 member) and Moeno Nito in Team Imagine's theater show . It was her first leading role in a stage show.
 June 30 - Became a member of Watarirouka Hashiritai 7, a sub-unit consisting of AKB48 members attached to Production Ogi.
 July 27 - Officially debuted as a member of Team A.
2011
 March 20 - Following the tsunami in Japan, she was one of two AKB48 members to perform at the "Japan Aid" Concert at Hilton Guam. She sang "Sakura no Ki ni Narō".
 March 29 - Announced in Team A's theater show that she is moving agency from Production Ogi to Nagara Production, a big agency handling famous enka singers such as Kiyoshi Hikawa and Yutaka Yamakawa, to pursue her singing career as an enka singer.
 April 1 - Officially joined Nagara Production, but she remained an active member of Watarirouka Hashiritai 7.
2012
 February 1 - Released her first solo debut,  under Tokuma Japan Communications. She was the third AKB48 member to release a solo CD after Tomomi Itano and Atsuko Maeda, and the first enka singer in AKB48. She held her first solo release event on January 31 in Shinbashi Station Square. 
 April 3 - Her first solo radio show  started broadcasting on TBS channel every Wednesday at 3:30 am.
 June 6 - Ranked 33rd in AKB48 27th Single Senbatsu General Election, and became the center of Next Girls. 
 July 29 - Held "Singing Mujin Eki (Ghost Station) in Ghost Station" event in Kuniyoshi Station of Izumi Railroad. After the event, she assumed the role of train conductor and rode the one-day only  with 40 fans chosen by lottery.
 August 24 - During AKB48 in Tokyo Dome concert, it was announced that she will be moving to New Team B.
 October 20 - During "Mujin Eki Photo Contest Awarding" event, it was announced that she will release her 2nd single on early 2013.
 November 1 - Officially became a member of Team B.
 November 3 - Participated as a starting member of Team B's Waiting Show.
2013
 January 9 - Released her second solo single,  under Tokuma Japan Communications. She held release events every day for a week from January 7 to 13 in various places. She debuted 6th in Oricon Daily Ranking, but successfully ranked 5th in Oricon Weekly Ranking.
2014
 January 20 - Her single "鞆の浦慕情" debuted at number one on the weekly Oricon Singles Chart. 
 In AKB48 Group Daisokaku Matsuri Shuffle held at February 24th 2014, It was announced that she will be moving to Team K.
 April 22 - Officially became a member of Team K
2015 
 During AKB48’s Spring Concert in Saitama Super Arena, it was announced that she will be transferred back to Team B.
2016
 January 30 - Announced her Graduation from AKB48 during her 21st Birthday and her Solo Concert, Iwasa Misaki 1st Concert ~Mujineki Kara Aratanaru Shuppatsu no Koku~
(岩佐美咲ファーストコンサート～無人駅から 新たなる出発の刻～) 
 March 14 - Graduated from the group.
 March 21 - Her last activity from the group.

Discography

AKB48 singles 
 2009
 "River"
  - Theater Girls

 2010
 "Ponytail to Shushu" 
  - Under Girls
 "Heavy Rotation"
  - as a substitute of Miho Miyazaki in music video
 "Beginner"
  - Under Girls
 "Chance no Junban"
  - Team A

 2011
 "Sakura no Ki ni Narō"
  - DIVA
 "Everyday, Kachusha"
  - Under Girls
 "Kaze wa Fuiteiru"
  - Under Girls
 "Ue kara Mariko"
  - Team A

 2012
 "Give Me Five!"
  - Special Girls B
 "Manatsu no Sounds Good!"
  - Special Girls
  - only in Theater ver. CD
 "Gingham Check"
  - Next Girls
 "Uza"
  - Team B
 "Eien Pressure"
  - only in Theater ver. CD

 2013
 "So Long!"
  - Team B
 "Sayonara Crawl"
  - Team B

Watarirouka Hashiritai 7

Unit Songs in Theater 

  as backdancer
  as backdancer
  as substitute of Miho Miyazaki

  as backdancer

  as backdancer

 Substitute of Aika Ota in all songs
  as backdancer
  as backdancer

 Substitute of Rina Chikano in all songs (when Yuko Oshima was absent)
  as a substitute of Manami Oku

 
  as backdancer

Theater G-Rosso 
  as stand-by for Tomomi Kasai, Reina Fujie, Aki Takajo, or Haruka Nakagawa 
  as substitute of Haruka Nakagawa or Atsuko Maeda'''

Solo discography

Singles 

*RIAJ Digital Tracks established April 2009.

References

External links 
Official profile
Official blog
Misaki Iwasa  -   Google+

1995 births
Living people
AKB48 members
Japanese idols
Japanese women pop singers
Enka singers
Musicians from Chiba Prefecture
Tokuma Japan Communications artists
21st-century Japanese singers
21st-century Japanese women singers